Elias Hößler (7 July 1663 in Crimmitschau, Saxony – 13 June 1746 in Sulzbach-Rosenberg) was from Saxony originally, active in the Upper Palatinate and Franconia as a pipe organ builder.

He began organ building teaching near Andreas Haß in Greiz in Vogtland, and later moved to Hersbruck.  On 21 October 1704, he became a resident of Lauf in der Nähe near Nuremberg.  He preferred to work in the Nuremberg area and in the western and central Upper Palatinate.  In 1744, he retired to a hospital in Sulzbach-Rosenberg.

Proven works

Bibliography
 Michael Bernhard: Orgeldatenbank Bayern. Version 5, 2009.
 Hermann Fischer, Theodor Wohnhaas: Orgeldenkmale in Mittelfranken. Schneider/Rentsch, Lauffen 2001, .
 Geschichte der Orgeln in St. Marien. In: Katholische Pfarrgemeinde St. Marien und Stadt Sulzbach-Rosenberg: 750 Jahre Pfarrgemeinde St. Marien. Sulzbach-Rosenberg 2002, S. 135–150.
 Eberhard Kraus: Historische Orgeln in der Oberpfalz. Schnell und Steiner, München 1990, .
 Jörg Schindler: Elias Hößler, Leben und Werk. Facharbeit im Leistungskurs Musik, Amberg 1981.

1663 births
1746 deaths
German pipe organ builders
People from Sulzbach-Rosenberg